Haberdashers' Adams is a grammar school for boys aged 11–18 and girls aged 16–18, located in Newport, Shropshire, offering day and boarding education. Current (2021) boarding fees are £12,144 per year and £13,644 per year for overseas students It was founded in 1656 by William Adams, a wealthy member of the Worshipful Company of Haberdashers (one of the Great Twelve Livery Companies of the City of London). In January 2018, the school changed its name to Haberdashers’ Adams, replacing the previous name, Adams' Grammar School (AGS). From 2024, the school will go fully co-ed admitting girls into Year 7.

History

Adams was founded in 1656 by Alderman William Adams, a wealthy City of London merchant and haberdasher, who was born in Newport and whose younger brother Sir Thomas Adams became Lord Mayor of London. Adams had no children and never married, so therefore decided to leave a bequest for the foundation of the school, which was first opened on 25 March 1656, during the politically unstable and volatile period of the English Interregnum. Having received permission from Oliver Cromwell to found the school, Adams sought to further ensure the school's continued existence by appointing the Master and Wardens of the Haberdashers' Company as governors in perpetuity. As one of the few schools founded during the Interregnum period, the school's articles of foundation were reconfirmed by Act of Parliament in 1660, upon the Restoration of the Monarchy; a copy of which is held in the school archives.

Adams endowed the school with a large agricultural  estate at Knighton in Staffordshire, providing income for future generations; as a result of this, Knighton was exempt from all land taxes until 1990. The school was endowed with 1,400 books soon after its foundation, which at the time represented one of the largest school libraries in England. A typical Oxford or Cambridge college then only had about 1,000 books. Only seven of these 1,400 books are still in the school's ownership, with the rest having been sold at various times when the school has suffered financial hardship.

In the 18th century, the young Samuel Johnson, who was later to be a pre-eminent scholar, applied unsuccessfully for the headmastership, which went to Samuel Lea.

The Knighton estate was eventually sold off in several portions over the course of the twentieth century, and the proceeds of the final sale were used by the Haberdashers' Company to purchase Longford Hall as a boarding house for the school.

Adams developed slowly, and did not expand beyond its original building, now known as Big School, until the turn of the last century, when Main School (also known as the S-Block) was built in the 1920s. Over the course of the next 90 years Adams' expanded rapidly, acquiring a number of buildings on Lower Bar in Newport for use as boarding houses; this in turn greatly expanded the school's town centre site. In the 1960s a new science block, connected to Main School was built, whilst a senior boarding master's house was created on land adjacent to Big School. During this period the school also acquired a new gymnasium, which was subsequently converted into a theatre in the mid-2000s.

During the First World War, 362 Old Novaportans (former pupils) served in the Armed Forces of whom 45 died and 77 survived wounded. After the War a memorial fund was set up to assist the sons of the deceased, and an appeal raised £1,000. A tablet listing those who died was unveiled in the Main School building in 1921. In 1948, the Old Boys' Club erected another tablet alongside this to those who died in the Second World War.  Both memorials are now displayed in the School Library.

In the modern era, the school's status has been expressed in a number of statutory arrangements. In 1950 the school became a voluntary aided school then after a brief spell as a grant-maintained school in the 1980s, Adams again faced threat of closure or conversion to co-educational comprehensive status in the early 1990s; this was avoided by a successful campaign, organised by parents and governors, against the wishes of Shropshire County Council. In the late 1990s and 2000s Adams again enjoyed voluntary-aided status; throughout its history the Haberdashers' Company has been key in supporting the school's vision and offering financial support for some of the more ambitious construction projects.

In 1993,  girls were admitted to the sixth form for the first time, bringing to an end Adams' long tradition of educating boys only.
The 1990s also saw the construction of the Wood and Taylor Centres for the study of design technology and maths, reflecting the school's status in the later 1990s as a technology college. In the early 2000s, the school began to raise funds for he construction of a new state-of-the-art sports hall and fitness suite to replace dilapidated facilities.

In 2002 a history of the school by former headmaster David Taylor and his wife, Ruth, was published. 

The late 2000s saw the school celebrate its 350th anniversary (in 2006), completion of a new science block and conversion of the former gymnasium into a performing arts centre (this, in turn, was converted into a Sixth Form Centre, which opened in 2013). The music department was condemned in 2006; The Coach House, on Salters Lane, which backs onto the school grounds, was acquired by the Haberdashers' Company and converted into a new music department, which opened in 2013 alongside the new Sixth Form Centre.

In June 2008, a new funding agreement was signed, which provided that monies would be provided to Telford & Wrekin Council to build a new school on the Abraham Darby site under the Building Schools for the Future scheme. The Governors were heavily involved in the approval of the plans and selection of the builders and architects.

Following the passing of the Academies Act in 2010, the directors of the Adams' Federation, in conjunction with the Haberdashers’ Company, agreed to apply to the Department for Education for Adams’ Grammar School to be converted into a “new style” academy and to amend the Federation so that the two schools became combined into the ownership of the Haberdashers' Adams Federation Trust.

In 2011 Adams became an academy in the Federation with another Haberdashers' school Haberdashers' Abraham Darby Academy. 
As of 2018 the school changed its name from Adams' Grammar School to Haberdashers' Adams. This was reportedly done in order to reflect the school's historic links with the Worshipful Company of Haberdashers.

Admissions and performance
Adams is a selective school which admits both boarding and day pupils, with ever-increasing numbers of foreign students, especially from Hong Kong.

Academic performance
Adams was rated by Ofsted as a Grade 1 outstanding school during 2013. More recently, the school has been scored as average with a Progress 8 score of −0.02 by the Department for Education.

School life 

As of November 2016 the headmaster is Gary Hickey, who was previously deputy head of the school.

House system 
Adams operates an extra-curricular house system and is the basis of inter-house sports competitions, traditionally a source of pride for pupils of their respective houses (all named after Shropshire-born notables):

 Owen House, named after Wilfred Owen, one of the leading poets of the First World War (born near Oswestry) sports scarlet as its colours. This house was called Clive House after Robert Clive of India until 2021 when it was renamed after criticism arose of Robert Clive in light of the George Floyd protests.
 Darwin House, traditionally sports royal blue and is named after Shrewsbury-born Charles Darwin, the celebrated 19th-century naturalist.
 Talbot House, the last of the three original "Salopian" houses, traditionally displays black and white (arranged in hoops, e.g. on rugby jerseys) as its sporting colours; it is named after Whitchurch-born "Old Talbot" (Sir John Talbot, later Earl of Shrewsbury) of the famous local Talbot family and one of the foremost English military commanders of the French medieval wars.
 Webb House, was founded in 1994 and assumed emerald green as its distinguishing colours; it is named after Dawley-born merchant naval officer and accomplished swimmer, Captain Matthew Webb.
 Sa'adu House, the newest house being announced in 2020 and being formed in the school year starting 2021, named after NHS worker and Old Novaportan who died during the COVID-19 pandemic, Alfa Sa'adu, assuming purple as its house colour.

Throughout the academic year there are many house events, revolving around the arts, sports or academic subjects. These include the House Music Competition; Dixon Cup, which covers drama and public speaking; Smedley Cup and House 7s, which are both rugby competitions; and other sports competitions such as House Cross Country and House Swimming. Intra-house geography, history, poetry and languages competitions also take place. The newest house event is House E-Sports.

Boarding houses and student leadership 

The school owns a number of dedicated boarding houses. The present junior hall (Longford Hall) is located by the school's playing fields about a mile away. In 2017 the Haberdashers' enabled the school to purchase and re-furbish Beaumaris Court, a former care home, to become the school's new senior boarding house, Beaumaris Hall. This new facility replaced the three senior boys' boarding houses which were situated in large Georgian townhouses facing the High Street.

Longford Hall was built in 1785 for Colonel Ralph Leeke, political agent to the British East India Company; the building was designed by Joseph Bonomi, who was an associate of Robert and James Adam.

The hall is located on top of a low rise and overlooks farmland towards the Lilleshall Monument. As with many such buildings, the first 100 feet in front of the hall comprises manicured grass, bordered by a ha-ha to prevent animals from entering; today the ha-ha is best known amongst pupils for forming a part of the school's annual house cross-country course. There are a small series of formal gardens, including a "Quad". Behind the hall is a selection of buildings around a central square including a dovecote, once part of the estate's home farm.

Upon entry into the school in year 7, boarders are assigned to dormitories; upon moving to Beaumaris Court boys are often assigned to double or, in some cases, single rooms.

In every upper sixth year there is a dedicated boarding captain (in addition to the four house captains, two school captains and a varying number of deputy school captains); collectively the school's captains are referred to as the front bench as they often sit in a line facing the rest of the student body at full school assemblies.

Combined Cadet Force 
The school's CCF is available to year 8 students and above, a result of which the school sends many officer candidate students to Sandhurst, Royal Air Force College Cranwell and the Britannia Royal Naval College. The CCF also plays a role in Newport civic life, parading every year on Remembrance Sunday. The CCF recruits each January from the Second Form and with cadets passing out in May of the same year.

The Corps has its own building where its stores are housed and NCO meetings and some lessons take place. The Corps frequently holds Overnight Exercises where battle drills and fieldcraft are practised; these are held either at Longford Hall, Nesscliffe Training Area or ROF Swynnerton. Until 2017, when the Sixth Form went on study leave, the CCF prepared for the Annual House CCF Competition, known as The Thompstone Trophy, after Lt-Col Brian Thompstone; this entailed a Drill Competition, Shooting, Command Tasks, Memory Games, Forces-related Quizzes, Section Attacks, CQB and an OBS course. The Corps is inspected every two years (the Biennial Inspection) by a senior Army or RAF officer.

Both the Army and RAF sections of the CCF hold Summer Camps every year, visiting working military bases such as RAF Cranwell and Barry Buddon Training Area. Cadets can also attend Adventure Training Camps held annually at Llanbedr and Windermere, Easter Camps at RAF Akrotiri, Summer Camps at Ramstein Air Base and Leadership Courses at RAF Cranwell, Nesscliffe Training Area or at Frimley Park. Additionally, cadets also have the opportunity of attending special events such as the 65th D-Day Landing Commemorations and the Cadet 150 Celebrations.

Sport

Adams has traditionally been a rugby school, and as such requires all boys play rugby through years seven and eight during the autumn and spring terms. Upon entry into year nine, pupils are presented with the option of continuing to play rugby, or switching to field hockey. Cricket and athletics are the main sports disciplines undertaken during the shorter summer term. In year 11 and the sixth form, boys are often presented with the opportunity to take part in any sport of their choice, provided they can receive permission for such an activity. With the exception of those activities not provided by the school, all sporting events, and training therefore takes place at the school's Longford Hall playing fields; for this reason, few visiting sports teams ever see the Main School site. Adams operates a system of games afternoons, a system by which each individual year group is assigned a specific day of the week to attend afternoon physical activity sessions at Longford (for this purpose the sixth Form is combined with year 11).

In the early 21st century, football was reintroduced to the school after an absence of almost 100 years.

As with many private and grammar schools, Adams organises biennial summer tours abroad for its senior rugby, hockey and girls netball teams. Recent tours have included rugby tours to South Africa, South America, Australia and Singapore, and a hockey and netball tour to Barbados.

International links 

Adams' currently runs student exchange programmes with the following schools in France, Germany and Poland:

AGS also corresponds with Ringwood Secondary College in Melbourne, Australia.

Old Novaportans

The School supports the Old Novaportans' Club which organises reunions, dinners and sporting events throughout the year to which its members are invited.

Former pupils are known as "Old Novaportans" (initialised as "ON").

Academia 
  Piers Corbyn (born 1947) — weather forecaster, businessman, activist, anti-vaxxer and conspiracy theorist
 Donald Court (1912–1994) – James Spence Professor of Child Health at Newcastle University (1955–72) and former President of the British Paediatric Association
 William Cureton (1808–1864) – orientalist
 Dave Goulson (born 1965) – professor of biology (evolution, behaviour and environment) at the University of Sussex, expert on bumblebees and founder of the Bumblebee Conservation Trust
 Thomas Hollis (1720–1774) – benefactor of Harvard University, political propagandist, patron of Canaletto among other artists
 Helmut Koenigsberger (1918–2014) – professor of history, King's College, London, 1973–84, later emeritus.
 Sir Oliver Lodge (1851–1940)– inventor & first principal of Birmingham University
 Stuart Meeson (born 1972 in Newport) – physicist in Electrical Impedance Tomography and Mammography
 James E. Quibell (1867–1935) – archaeologist and leading British Egyptologist
 Maurice Stacey (1907–94) – worked alongside Sir Norman Haworth to artificially synthesize vitamin C

Clergy 
 Robert Charnock (1663–1696) –  Dean of Magdalen College, Oxford, conspirator who planned to kill King William III
 Silvester Horne (1865–1914) – MP for Ipswich, Congregationalist Minister, and father of Kenneth Horne
 Gerald Lander (1861–1934) – Bishop of Victoria, Hong Kong
 Thomas Percy (1729–1811) – became Bishop of Dromore, wrote Reliques of Ancient English Poetry in 1765

Media and arts 
 M. J. Bassett – film director and scriptwriter
 Simon Bates (born 1946) – radio disc jockey
 Barrington J. Bayley (1937–2008) – science fiction writer
 Tom Brown (1662–1704)– satirist
 Radzi Chinyanganya (born 1987) – TV presenter
 Ewen Henderson (1934–2000) – sculptor
 Norman Jones (1932–2013)
 Eliot Higgins (born 1979) – investigative journalist, founder of Bellingcat

Politics & business 
 Peter Butler (born 1951) – former Conservative MP for North East Milton Keynes from 1992 to 1997, and current chief executive of Flying Scotsman plc
 Jeremy Corbyn (born 1949) – Labour MP for Islington North since 1983, Leader of the Opposition and Leader of the Labour Party from 2015 to 2020
 Nick Jenkins (born 1967) – chief executive of moonpig.com, former Glencore commodities trader.

 John Leveson-Gower, 1st Earl Gower (1694–1754) – Lord Privy Seal 1742–54, and first senior Tory member of government since George I of Great Britain's coronation in 1714
 Thomas Parker, Earl of Macclesfield (1666–1732) – Lord Chancellor and Acting Regent of Great Britain

Military 
 Captain Thomas Ashburnham (1855–1924) – 6th Earl of Ashburnham
 General George Colt Langley (1810–96) – General, Royal Marines
 Matthew Smith (ca.1665-ca.1723) – 17th-century spy, intriguer and writer
 Sir Charles Buckworth-Herne-Soame Bt (1864–1931) 10th Baronet
 Major-General Francis Ventris (1857–1929) – General Officer Commanding British Forces in China

Sports 
 Cedric Boyns (born 1954) - cricket player for Shropshire and Worcestershire County Cricket Clubs.
 Peter Ranells (born 1954) - cricket player for Shropshire.
 Graham Kitchener (born 1989) – rugby player for Worcester Warriors and England
 Dan Redfern (born 1990) – cricket player for Shropshire, Derbyshire and Leicestershire County Cricket Clubs
 Peter Short (born 1979) – rugby player for Bath Rugby and England Saxons

Former staff 
 Ryan Palmer (born 1974) – maths teacher and ex-Jamaican national chess champion
 Agnes Miller Parker (1895–1980) – former art teacher, engraver and illustrator
 Alec Peterson  (1908–1988) – former headmaster, founder of the International Baccalaureate
 Donald Fear – history and government and politics teacher, the sixth person ever to win £1,000,000 on Who Wants To Be a Millionaire? in 2020

See also 

 Longford Hall – junior boarding house and sports fields owned by the school, situated about one mile (1.6 km) away from the Main School site, in the village of Longford
 Grade II* listed buildings in Telford and Wrekin
 Listed buildings in Newport, Shropshire

References

External links 
 Official website

1656 establishments in England
Academies in Telford and Wrekin
Boarding schools in Shropshire
Boys' schools in Shropshire
Buildings and structures in Newport, Shropshire
Educational institutions established in the 1650s
Grammar schools in Telford and Wrekin
Grade II* listed buildings in Shropshire
Haberdashers' Schools
Newport, Shropshire
State funded boarding schools in England
Training schools in England